Sky is the debut album by the supergroup Sky, released in 1979.

The album was a chart success, reaching the top 10 in both Australia and the UK charts, and being certified Platinum in the UK.

In 2014 Esoteric Recordings started a schedule of remasters and expanded releases with this recording.

Critical response
In a retrospective review, AllMusic portrayed the album negatively, saying "this album plods along with no apparent destination."

Track listing

Original vinyl and cassette

1992 and 1994 CD releases
1992 : Freestyle Records (SKY CD 1), Music Club (MCCD077)
1994 : Nota Blu (9403200), Merlin Records

The 1992 Freestyle Records split "Where Opposites Meet" into its component parts, whereas all the others combined them all into one track. All other CD issues up to and including the 2005 Sanctuary Records release only contained the original album.

The Merlin Records CD contained new artwork exclusive to that edition.

2007 Arcàngelo double CD (ARC-7249/50)

All tracks on the second disc are taken from Sky 3 and Sky 4: Forthcoming

2014 Esoteric Recordings CD and DVD

2015 Let Them Eat Vinyl double LP

Personnel
 John Williams – acoustic guitars
 Francis Monkman – piano, synthesizer, harpsichord
 Herbie Flowers – bass guitar
 Tristan Fry – drums, percussion
 Kevin Peek – electric and acoustic guitars

Charts

Certifications

References

1979 debut albums
Arista Records albums
Ariola Records albums
Sky (English/Australian band) albums
Media containing Gymnopedies